Midnight Special may refer to:

Music  
 "Midnight Special" (song), a 1905 song popularized by Lead Belly
 The Midnight Special and Other Southern Prison Songs, a 1940 album by Lead Belly
Midnight Special (Lead Belly album), 1947
 Midnight Special (Al Smith album), 1961
 Midnight Special (Harry Belafonte album), 1962
 Midnight Special (Jimmy Smith album), 1961
 Midnight Special (Uncle Kracker album), 2012

Other 
 Midnight Special (film), a 2016 feature film by Jeff Nichols
 The Midnight Special (film), a 1930 pre-Code sound film 
 The Midnight Special (radio), an American syndicated folk and roots music program 
 The Midnight Special (TV series), a 1972–1981 late-night American musical variety series
 The Midnight Special (train), an American night train formerly operated by the Chicago and Alton Railroad and the Gulf, Mobile and Ohio Railroad